Fyen Rundt  is a professional single-day cycling race held annually in Denmark. It is part of the UCI Europe Tour in category 1.2. The race has been held since 1894, making it one of the oldest cycling races.

Winners

Amateur

Professional

References

External links

Cycle races in Denmark
UCI Europe Tour races
Recurring sporting events established in 1894
1894 establishments in Denmark
Summer events in Denmark